The 2019 Miami RedHawks football team represented Miami University in the 2019 NCAA Division I FBS football season. They were led by sixth year head coach Chuck Martin and played their home games at Yager Stadium in Oxford, Ohio, as members of the East Division of the Mid-American Conference.

Previous season
The RedHawks finished the 2018 season 6–6 6–2 in MAC Play to finish in a tie for second place in the East Division.

Preseason

MAC media poll
The MAC released their preseason media poll on July 23, 2019, with the RedHawks predicted to finish in second place in the East Division.

Schedule

Personnel

Coaching staff

Game summaries

at Iowa

Tennessee Tech

at Cincinnati

at Ohio State

Buffalo

at Western Michigan

Northern Illinois

at Kent State

at Ohio

Bowling Green

Akron

at Ball State

MAC Championship Game

vs. Louisiana (LendingTree Bowl)

Players drafted into the NFL

References

Miami
Miami RedHawks football seasons
Mid-American Conference football champion seasons
Miami RedHawks football